Exton is a surname, and may refer to:

 Clive Exton (1930–2007), British television and film screenwriter
 Harold Exton, mathematician
 Hugh Exton (1864–1955), South African photographer
 John Exton (lawyer) (c. 1600–c. 1665), English admiralty lawyer
 John Exton (composer) (1933–2009), British composer of classical music
 John Exton (priest) (died 1430), Canon of Windsor
 Nicholas Exton (died 1402), Lord Mayor of London from 1386-8
 Rodney Exton (1927–1999), English cricketer
 Thomas Exton (1631–1688), English lawyer, Member of Parliament and Master of Trinity Hall, Cambridge

See also 

 Hexton
 Reston (surname)
 Sexton (surname)
 Wexton

Surnames
English-language surnames
Surnames of English origin
Surnames of British Isles origin